Gunananda Himi Migettuwatte is an upcoming Sri Lankan Sinhala biographical patriotic film directed by Sisil Gunesekera and co-produced by director himself with Kamal Karunanayake. The film is about the life of Venarable Migettuwatte Gunananda Thero, who was a Buddhist monk and hero of the Panadura debate during British colonial time. It stars Roger Seneviratne in lead role along with Suranga Ranawaka, Priyankara Rathnayake and Lucky Dias. Music composed by Nilatha Sri Pathirana.

Production
The film has been shot on location at Kosgoda, Balapitiya, Dambulla, Kalutara, Panadura and Kotahena areas, with filming being completed in 34 days.

Plot

Cast
 Roger Seneviratne as Migel aka Gunananda Thero
 Suranga Ranawaka
 Priyankara Rathnayake
 Lucky Dias
 Wimalindra Kumari
 Vasanthi Chathurani
 Buddhadasa Vithanarachchi
 Douglas Ranasinghe
 Daya Thennakoon
 Palitha Silva
 Wijeratne Warakagoda
 Wasantha Vittachchi
 Ramani Siriwardena
 D. B. Gangodathenna
 Somaweera Gamage
 Methyl Jayasuriya as Litte Migel

References

Sinhala-language films